SC Bayer 05 Uerdingen is one of the largest sports clubs in the city of Krefeld, North Rhine-Westphalia, Germany. , it had over 6000 members. The club emerged from the 1995 dissolution of FC Bayer 05 Uerdingen, the football department of which is now known as KFC Uerdingen 05.

In 2020, the club entered into a joint venture with the German Cricket Federation to construct Germany's national cricket performance centre, which includes the Bayer Uerdingen Cricket Ground, an international standard facility. The performance centre is located adjacent to the club's Bayer Sportstadion within the Bayer Uerdingen sports park, in Uerdingen, a district of Krefeld.

References

External links
 

Multi-sport clubs in Germany
Sport in Krefeld